Andrew Gardner (17 April 1877 – after 1908) was a Scottish professional footballer who made 48 appearances in the English Football League playing as an outside left for Grimsby Town, Newcastle United and Bolton Wanderers. He also played for Scottish League club Clyde and for Southern League clubs Brighton & Hove Albion, where he was top scorer in 1904–05 with 13 goals in all competitions, and Queens Park Rangers. Gardner was born in Oban, Scotland.

References

1877 births
People from Oban
Year of death missing
Place of death missing
Scottish footballers
Association football wingers
Clyde F.C. players
Grimsby Town F.C. players
Newcastle United F.C. players
Bolton Wanderers F.C. players
Brighton & Hove Albion F.C. players
Queens Park Rangers F.C. players
Carlisle United F.C. players
Johnstone F.C. players
English Football League players
Southern Football League players
Sportspeople from Argyll and Bute